Below is a list of members of the European Parliament serving in the ninth term (2019–2024). It is sorted by list position or in cases of multiple constituencies, an English perception of surname treating all variations of de/di/do, van/von, Ó/Ní/Uí, and so forth as part of the collation key, even if this is not the normal practice in a member's own country. The term began on 2 July 2019.

At the beginning of the 2019–2024 term, there were 751 members of parliament divided among the 28 member states, which changed after the United Kingdom left the European Union. 27 MEPs were seated after the withdrawal of the United Kingdom from the European Union (those elected but not yet seated MEPs are shown separately). The number of MEPs decreased to 705 after that.

Political groups

The European Parliament is divided into several political groups:
 European People's Party Group (EPP)
 Progressive Alliance of Socialists and Democrats (S&D)
 Renew Europe (Renew)
 Greens–European Free Alliance (Greens/EFA)
 Identity and Democracy (ID)
 European Conservatives and Reformists (ECR)
 The Left in the European Parliament – GUE/NGL (The Left)

Members of the European Parliament

Austria 

On the Austrian People's Party list: (EPP Group)
Othmar Karas
Karoline Edtstadler – until 6 January 2020Christian Sagartz – since 23 January 2020
Angelika Winzig
Simone Schmiedtbauer
Lukas Mandl
Barbara Thaler
Alexander Bernhuber

On the Social Democratic Party of Austria list: (S&D)
Andreas Schieder
Evelyn Regner
Günther Sidl
Bettina Vollath – until 9 October 2022Theresa Muigg – since 10 October 2022
Hannes Heide

On the Freedom Party list: (ID)
Harald Vilimsky
Georg Mayer
Roman Haider

On The Greens – The Green Alternative list: (Greens-EFA)
Sarah Wiener
Monika Vana
Thomas Waitz – since 1 February 2020

On the NEOS – The New Austria list: (Renew)
Claudia Gamon

Belgium 

Dutch-speaking college

On the New Flemish Alliance list: (ECR)
Geert Bourgeois
Assita Kanko
Johan Van Overtveldt

On the Flemish Interest list: (ID)
Gerolf Annemans
Filip De Man
Tom Vandendriessche

On the Open Flemish Liberals and Democrats list: (Renew)
Guy Verhofstadt
Hilde Vautmans

On the Christian Democratic and Flemish list: (EPP Group)
Kris Peeters – until 11 January 2021Tom Vandenkendelaere – since 25 January 2021
Cindy Franssen

On the Forward list: (S&D)
Kathleen Van Brempt

On the Green list: (Greens-EFA)
Petra De Sutter – until 30 September 2020Sara Matthieu – since 8 October 2020

French-speaking college

On the Socialist Party list: (S&D)
Marie Arena
Marc Tarabella

On the Ecolo list: (Greens-EFA)
Philippe Lamberts
Saskia Bricmont

On the Reformist Movement list: (Renew)
Olivier Chastel
Frédérique Ries

On the Workers' Party of Belgium list: (GUE–NGL)
Marc Botenga

On the Humanist Democratic Centre list: (EPP Group)
Benoît Lutgen

German-speaking college

On the Christian Social Party list: (EPP Group)
Pascal Arimont

Bulgaria 

On the Citizens for European Development of Bulgaria list: (EPP Group)
Andrey Kovatchev
Andrey Novakov
Eva Maydell
Asim Ademov
Alexander Yordanov (SDS)
Emil Radev

On the Bulgarian Socialist Party list: (S&D)
Elena Yoncheva
Sergei Stanishev
Petar Vitanov
Tsvetelina Penkova
Ivo Hristov

On the Movement for Rights and Freedoms list: (Renew)
Ilhan Kyuchyuk
Iskra Mihaylova
Atidzhe Alieva-Veli

On the IMRO – Bulgarian National Movement list: (ECR)
Angel Dzhambazki
Andrei Slabakov

On the Democrats for a Strong Bulgaria list: (EPP Group)
Radan Kanev

Croatia 

On the Croatian Democratic Union list (EPP Group)
Karlo Ressler
Dubravka Šuica – until 30 November 2019Sunčana Glavak – since 1 December 2019
Tomislav Sokol
Željana Zovko

On the Social Democratic Party of Croatia list: (S&D)
Tonino Picula
Biljana Borzan
Predrag Fred Matić
Romana Jerković – since 1 February 2020

On an Independent list: (Non-Inscrits)
Mislav Kolakušić

On the Croatian Conservative Party-led list: (ECR)
Ruža Tomašić – until 30 June 2021Ladislav Ilčić – since 1 July 2021

On the Human Shield list: (Non-Inscrits)
Ivan Vilibor Sinčić

On the Amsterdam Coalition list:
Valter Flego (IDS, Renew)

Cyprus 

On the Democratic Rally list: (EPP Group)
Loukas Fourlas
Lefteris Christoforou – until 1 November 2022Eleni Stavrou – since 2 November 2022

On the Progressive Party of Working People list: (GUE–NGL)
Giorgis Georgiou
Niyazi Kızılyürek

On the Democratic Party list: (S&D)
Costas Mavrides

On the Movement for Social Democracy list: (S&D)
Dimitris Papadakis (expelled from the party on 10 February 2020)

Czech Republic 

On the ANO list: (Renew)
Dita Charanzová
Martina Dlabajová
Martin Hlaváček
Radka Maxová (left the party on 3 October 2020, since 24 March 2021 S&D)
Ondřej Knotek
Ondřej Kovařík

On the Civic Democratic Party list: (ECR)
Jan Zahradil
Alexandr Vondra
Evžen Tošenovský
Veronika Vrecionová

On the Czech Pirate Party list: (Greens-EFA)
Marcel Kolaja
Markéta Gregorová
Mikuláš Peksa

On the TOP 09–Mayors and Independents list: (EPP Group)
Luděk Niedermayer
Jiří Pospíšil
Stanislav Polčák (STAN)

On the Freedom and Direct Democracy list: (ID)
Hynek Blaško
Ivan David

On the Christian and Democratic Union - Czechoslovak People's Party list: (EPP Group)
Tomáš Zdechovský
Michaela Šojdrová

On the Communist Party of Bohemia and Moravia list: (GUE–NGL)
Kateřina Konečná

Denmark 

On the Venstre list: (Renew)
Morten Løkkegaard
Søren Gade
Asger Christensen
Linea Søgaard-Lidell – since 1 February 2020

On the Social Democrats list: (S&D)
Christel Schaldemose
Niels Fuglsang
Marianne Vind

On the Socialist People's Party list: (Greens-EFA)
Margrete Auken
Kira Marie Peter-Hansen

On the Danish Social Liberal Party list: (Renew)
Morten Helveg Petersen
Karen Melchior

On the Danish People's Party list: (ID)
Peter Kofod

On the Conservative People's Party list: (EPP Group)
Pernille Weiss

On the Red-Green Alliance list: (GUE–NGL)
Nikolaj Villumsen

Estonia 

On the Estonian Reform Party list: (Renew)
Andrus Ansip
Urmas Paet

On the Social Democratic Party list: (S&D)
Marina Kaljurand
Sven Mikser

On the Estonian Centre Party list: (Renew)
Yana Toom

On the Conservative People's Party of Estonia list: (ID)
Jaak Madison

On the Pro Patria and Res Publica Union list: (EPP Group)
Riho Terras – since 1 February 2020

Finland 

On the National Coalition Party list:  (EPP Group)
Sirpa Pietikäinen
Petri Sarvamaa
Henna Virkkunen

On the Green League list: (Greens-EFA)
Heidi Hautala
Ville Niinistö
Alviina Alametsä – since 1 February 2020

On the Social Democratic Party list: (S&D)
Eero Heinäluoma
Miapetra Kumpula-Natri

On the Finns Party list: (ID)
Teuvo Hakkarainen
Laura Huhtasaari

On the Centre Party list: (Renew)
Elsi Katainen
Mauri Pekkarinen

On the Left Alliance list: (GUE–NGL)
Silvia Modig

On the Swedish People's Party of Finland list: (Renew)
Nils Torvalds

France 

On the National Rally list: (ID)
Jordan Bardella
Hélène Laporte – until 28 July 2022Marie Dauchy – from 29 July 2022
Thierry Mariani
Dominique Bilde
Hervé Juvin
Joëlle Mélin – until 28 July 2022Éric Minardi – from 29 July 2022
Nicolas Bay (since 15 February 2022 Reconquête and Non-inscrits)
Virginie Joron
Jean-Paul Garraud
Catherine Griset
Gilles Lebreton
Maxette Grisoni-Pirbakas (since 2 February 2022 Reconquête and Non-inscrits)
Jean-François Jalkh
Aurélia Beigneux
Gilbert Collard (since 22 January 2022 Reconquête and Non-inscrits)
Julie Lechanteux – until 28 July 2022Patricia Chagnon – from 29 July 2022
Philippe Olivier
Annika Bruna
Jérôme Rivière (since 19 January 2022 Reconquête and Non-inscrits)
France Jamet
André Rougé
Mathilde Androuët
Jean-Lin Lacapelle – since 1 February 2020

On the La République En Marche! list: (Renew)
Nathalie Loiseau
Pascal Canfin
Marie-Pierre Vedrenne (MoDem)
Jérémy Decerle (independent)
Catherine Chabaud (MoDem)
Stéphane Séjourné
Fabienne Keller (Agir)
Bernard Guetta (independent)
Irène Tolleret
Stéphane Bijoux (independent)
Sylvie Brunet (MoDem)
Gilles Boyer
Stéphanie Yon-Courtin
Pierre Karleskind
Laurence Despaux-Farreng (MoDem)
Dominique Riquet (MR)
Véronique Trillet-Lenoir
Pascal Durand
Valérie Hayer
Christophe Grudler (MoDem)
Chrysoula Zacharopoulou (independent) – until 19 May 2022Max Orville – from 20 May 2022
Sandro Gozi (independent) – since 1 February 2020
Ilana Cicurel – since 1 February 2020

On the Europe Ecology – The Greens list: (Greens-EFA)
Yannick Jadot
Michèle Rivasi
Damien Carême
Marie Toussaint
David Cormand
Karima Delli
Mounir Satouri
Caroline Roose (AEI)
François Alfonsi (R&PS)
Salima Yenbou (AEI, since 8 March 2022 Renew Europe)
Benoît Biteau (independent)
Gwendoline Delbos-Corfield
Claude Gruffat – since 1 February 2020

On The Republicans list: (EPP Group)
François-Xavier Bellamy
Agnès Evren
Arnaud Danjean
Nadine Morano
Brice Hortefeux
Nathalie Colin-Oesterlé (The Centrists)
Geoffroy Didier
Anne Sander

On the La France Insoumise list: (GUE–NGL)
Manon Aubry
Manuel Bompard – until 28 July 2022Marina Mesure – from 29 July 2022
Leïla Chaibi
Younous Omarjee
Anne-Sophie Pelletier
Emmanuel Maurel (GRS)

On the Socialist Party-Place Publique–New Deal list: (S&D)
Raphaël Glucksmann (PP)
Sylvie Guillaume
Éric Andrieu
Aurore Lalucq (PP)
Pierre Larrouturou (ND)
Nora Mebarek – since 1 February 2020

Germany 

On the Christian Democratic Union list: (EPP Group)
Hildegard Bentele
Stefan Berger
Daniel Caspary
Lena Düpont
Jan Christian Ehler
Michael Gahler
Jens Gieseke
Niclas Herbst
Peter Jahr
Peter Liese
Norbert Lins
David McAllister
Markus Pieper
Dennis Radtke
Christine Schneider
Sven Schulze – until 28 September 2021Karolin Braunsberger-Reinhold – since 7 October 2021
Andreas Schwab
Ralf Seekatz
Sven Simon
Sabine Verheyen
Axel Voss
Marion Walsmann
Rainer Wieland

On the Alliance 90/The Greens list: (Greens-EFA)
Ska Keller
Sven Giegold – until 15 December 2021Malte Gallée – since 22 December 2021
Terry Reintke
Reinhard Bütikofer
Hannah Neumann
Martin Häusling
Anna Cavazzini
Erik Marquardt
Katrin Langensiepen
Romeo Franz
Jutta Paulus
Sergey Lagodinsky
Henrike Hahn
Michael Bloss
Anna Deparnay-Grunenberg
Rasmus Andresen
Alexandra Geese
Niklas Nienaß
Viola von Cramon-Taubadel
Daniel Freund
Pierrette Herzberger-Fofana

On the Social Democratic Party of Germany list: (S&D)
Katarina Barley
Udo Bullmann
Maria Noichl
Jens Geier
Delara Burkhardt
Bernd Lange
Birgit Sippel
Dietmar Köster
Gabriele Bischoff
Ismail Ertug
Constanze Krehl – until 2 October 2022Matthias Ecke – since 3 October 2022
Tiemo Wölken
Petra Kammerevert
Norbert Neuser – until 10 January 2022Karsten Lucke – since 11 January 2022
Evelyne Gebhardt – until 1 February 2022René Repasi – since 2 February 2022
Joachim Schuster

On the Alternative for Germany list: (ID)
Jörg Meuthen (left the party on 28 January 2022, since 14 February 2022 Non-inscrits, joined Zentrum on 10 June 2022)
Guido Reil
Maximilian Krah
Lars Patrick Berg (left the party and the group on 11 May 2021, joined later ECR and LKR)
Bernhard Zimniok
Nicolaus Fest
Markus Buchheit
Christine Anderson
Sylvia Limmer
Gunnar Beck
Joachim Kuhs

On the Christian Social Union in Bavaria list: (EPP Group)
Manfred Weber
Angelika Niebler
Markus Ferber
Monika Hohlmeier
Christian Doleschal
Marlene Mortler

On the Free Democratic Party list: (Renew)
Nicola Beer
Svenja Hahn
Andreas Glück
Moritz Körner
Jan-Christoph Oetjen

On the Left list: (GUE–NGL)
Martin Schirdewan
Özlem Demirel
Cornelia Ernst
Helmut Scholz
Martina Michels

On The PARTY list: (Non-Inscrits)
Martin Sonneborn
Nico Semsrott (Greens-EFA) (left the party on 13 January 2021 but stayed in the group)

On the Free Voters list: (Renew)
Ulrike Müller
Engin Eroglu

On the Animal Protection Party list: (GUE–NGL)
Martin Buschmann (left the group on 29 January 2020)

On the Ecological Democratic Party list: (Greens-EFA)
Klaus Buchner – until 15 July 2020Manuela Ripa – since 16 July 2020

On the Family Party of Germany list: (ECR, since 29 April 2021 EPP Group)
Helmut Geuking

On the Volt Deutschland list: (Greens-EFA)
Damian Boeselager

On the Pirate Party list: (Greens-EFA)
Patrick Breyer

Greece 

On the New Democracy list:  (EPP Group)
Stelios Kympouropoulos
Vangelis Meimarakis
Maria Spyraki
Eliza Vozemberg
Manolis Kefalogiannis
Anna Asimakopoulou
Giorgos Kyrtsos (left the party on 18 February 2022, since 5 May 2022 Renew Europe)
Theodoros Zagorakis

On the Coalition of the Radical Left list: (GUE–NGL)
Dimitrios Papadimoulis
Elena Kountoura
Kostas Arvanitis
Stelios Kouloglou
Alexis Georgoulis
Petros S. Kokkalis

On the Movement for Change list: (S&D)
Nikos Androulakis
Eva Kaili

On the Communist Party of Greece list: (Non-Inscrits)
Konstantinos Papadakis
Lefteris Nikolaou-Alavanos

On the Golden Dawn list: (Non-Inscrits)
Ioannis Lagos (left the party on 13 July 2019)
Athanasios Konstantinou (left the party on 29 August 2020)

On the Greek Solution list: (ECR)
Kyriakos Velopoulos – until 7 July 2019Emmanouil Fragkos – since 10 July 2019

Hungary 

On the Fidesz–Christian Democratic People's Party list: (EPP Group, since 5 March 2020 Non-Inscrits)
László Trócsányi
József Szájer – until 1 January 2021Ernő Schaller-Baross – since 10 January 2021
Lívia Járóka
Tamás Deutsch
András Gyürk
Kinga Gál
Enikő Győri
György Hölvényi (KDNP, EPP Group)
Ádám Kósa
Andrea Bocskor
Andor Deli
Balázs Hidvéghi
Edina Tóth

On the Democratic Coalition list: (S&D)
Klára Dobrev
Csaba Molnár
Sándor Rónai
Attila Ara-Kovács

On the Momentum Movement list: (Renew)
Katalin Cseh
Anna Júlia Donáth

On the Hungarian Socialist Party–Dialogue for Hungary list: (S&D)
István Ujhelyi

On the Jobbik list: (Non-Inscrits)
Márton Gyöngyösi

Ireland 

As candidates of Fine Gael: (EPP Group)
Frances Fitzgerald
Seán Kelly
Mairead McGuinness – until 11 October 2020Colm Markey – since 20 November 2020
Maria Walsh
Deirdre Clune – since 1 February 2020

As candidates of Independents 4 Change: (GUE–NGL)
Clare Daly
Mick Wallace

As candidates of Green Party of Ireland: (Greens-EFA)
Ciarán Cuffe
Grace O'Sullivan

As candidate of Fianna Fáil: (Renew)
Billy Kelleher
Barry Andrews – since 1 February 2020

As candidate of Sinn Féin: (GUE–NGL)
Matt Carthy – until 9 February 2020Chris MacManus – since 6 March 2020

As an Independent candidate:
Luke 'Ming' Flanagan (GUE–NGL)

Italy 

On the League list: (ID)
Matteo Adinolfi
Simona Baldassarre
Alessandra Basso
Mara Bizzotto – until 12 October 2022Matteo Gazzini – since 2 November 2022
Cinzia Bonfrisco
Paolo Borchia
Marco Campomenosi
Andrea Caroppo (left the party on 6 October 2020, until 28 April 2021 Non-inscrits, since then EPP Group) – until 12 October 2022Elisabetta De Blasis – since 2 November 2022
Massimo Casanova
Susanna Ceccardi
Angelo Ciocca
Rosanna Conte
Gianantonio Da Re
Francesca Donato (left the party 20 September 2021, since 6 October 2021 Non-inscrits)
Marco Dreosto – until 12 October 2022Paola Ghidoni – since 2 November 2022
Gianna Gancia
Valentino Grant
Danilo Lancini
Elena Lizzi
Alessandro Panza
Luisa Regimenti (since 6 July 2021 Forza Italia and EPP Group)
Antonio Maria Rinaldi
Silvia Sardone
Annalisa Tardino
Isabella Tovaglieri
Lucia Vuolo (from 4 June 2021 to 10 October 2021 non-inscrits, since then Forza Italia and EPP Group)
Stefania Zambelli
Marco Zanni
Vincenzo Sofo – since 1 February 2020 (joined Brothers of Italy and ECR on 18 February 2021)

On the Democratic Party list: (S&D)
Pietro Bartolo
Brando Benifei
Simona Bonafé – until 12 October 2022Achille Variati – since 2 November 2022
Carlo Calenda (since 28 August 2019 Action party, since 17 November 2021 Renew Europe)  – until 12 October 2022
Caterina Chinnici
Paolo De Castro
Andrea Cozzolino
Giuseppe Ferrandino (left the party and joined Action - Italia Viva/Renew Europe on 9 November 2022)
Elisabetta Gualmini
Roberto Gualtieri – until 5 September 2019Nicola Danti – from 5 September 2019 (since 21 October 2019 Italia Viva and since 12 February 2020 Renew Europe)
Pierfrancesco Majorino
Alessandra Moretti
Pina Picierno
Giuliano Pisapia
Franco Roberti
David Sassoli – until 11 January 2022Camilla Laureti – from 12 January 2022
Massimiliano Smeriglio
Irene Tinagli
Patrizia Toia

On the Five Star Movement list: (Non-Inscrits)
Isabella Adinolfi (joined Forza Italia and the EPP Group on 28 April 2021)
Tiziana Beghin
Fabio Massimo Castaldo
Ignazio Corrao (left the party, since 9 December 2020 Greens–EFA)
Rosa D'Amato (left the party, since 9 December 2020 Greens–EFA)
Eleonora Evi (left the party, since 9 December 2020 Greens–EFA) – until 12 October 2022Maria Angela Danzì – since 2 November 2022
Laura Ferrara
Mario Furore
Chiara Maria Gemma (joined Together for the Future on 22 June 2022)
Dino Giarrusso (left the party on 26 May 2022, was member of South Calls North from 27 June 2022 to 2 August 2022)
Piernicola Pedicini (left the party, since 9 December 2020 Greens–EFA)
Sabrina Pignedoli
Daniela Rondinelli (joined Together for the Future on 22 June 2022)
Marco Zullo (left the party, since 10 March 2020 Renew Europe)

On the Forza Italia list: (EPP Group)
Silvio Berlusconi – until 12 October 2022Alessandra Mussolini – since 2 November 2022
Fulvio Martusciello
Giuseppe Milazzo (joined ECR on 23 June 2021)
Aldo Patriciello
Massimiliano Salini
Antonio Tajani – until 12 October 2022Lara Comi – since 2 November 2022
Salvatore De Meo – since 1 February 2020

On the Brothers of Italy list: (ECR)
Carlo Fidanza
Pietro Fiocchi
Raffaele Fitto – until 12 October 2022Denis Nesci – since 2 November 2022
Nicola Procaccini
Raffaele Stancanelli
Sergio Berlato – since 1 February 2020

On the South Tyrolean People's Party list: (EPP Group)
Herbert Dorfmann

Latvia 

On the Unity list: (EPP Group)
Sandra Kalniete
Inese Vaidere

On the Harmony list: (S&D)
Nils Ušakovs
Andris Ameriks

On the National Alliance list: (ECR)
Roberts Zīle
Dace Melbārde

On the Movement For! list: (Renew)
Ivars Ijabs

On the Latvian Russian Union list: (Greens-EFA, since 1 April 2022 Non-inscrits)
Tatjana Ždanoka

Lithuania 

On the Homeland Union list: (EPP Group)
Andrius Kubilius
Liudas Mažylis
Rasa Juknevičienė

On the Social Democratic Party of Lithuania list: (S&D)
Vilija Blinkevičiūtė
Juozas Olekas

On the Lithuanian Peasant and Greens Union list: (Greens-EFA)
Bronis Ropė
Stasys Jakeliūnas

On the Labour Party list: (Renew)
Viktor Uspaskich (expelled from the group on 20 January 2021, since then Non-inscrits)

On the Electoral Action of Poles in Lithuania list: (ECR)
Waldemar Tomaszewski

On the Liberal Movement list: (Renew)
Petras Auštrevičius

On an Independent list: (EPP Group)
Aušra Maldeikienė

Luxembourg 

On the Democratic Party list: (Renew)
Charles Goerens
Monica Semedo (left the party on 26 January 2021)

On the Christian Social People’s Party list: (EPP Group)
Christophe Hansen
Isabel Wiseler-Santos Lima

On The Greens list: (Greens-EFA)
Tilly Metz

On the Luxembourg Socialist Workers' Party list: (S&D)
Nicolas Schmit – until 30 November 2019Marc Angel – since 10 December 2019

Malta 

As candidates of the Labour Party: (S&D)
Miriam Dalli – until 18 October 2020Cyrus Engerer – since 5 November 2020
Alfred Sant
Alex Agius Saliba
Josianne Cutajar

As candidates of the Nationalist Party: (EPP Group)
Roberta Metsola
David Casa

Netherlands 

On the Labour Party list: (S&D)
Agnes Jongerius
Paul Tang
Kati Piri – until 30 March 2021Thijs Reuten – since 15 April 2021
Vera Tax
Mohammed Chahim
Lara Wolters

On the People's Party for Freedom and Democracy list: (Renew)
Malik Azmani
Jan Huitema
Caroline Nagtegaal
Liesje Schreinemacher – until 9 January 2022Catharina Rinzema – since 18 January 2022
Bart Groothuis – since 1 February 2020

On the Christian Democratic Appeal list: (EPP Group)
Esther de Lange
Jeroen Lenaers
Tom Berendsen
Annie Schreijer-Pierik

On the Forum for Democracy list: (ECR) (all members joined JA21 in December 2020)
Derk Jan Eppink – until 30 March 2021Michiel Hoogeveen – since 15 April 2021
Rob Roos
Rob Rooken
Dorien Rookmaker (Groep Otten and Non-inscrits, since 8 December 2021 ECR) – since 1 February 2020

On the GreenLeft list: (Greens-EFA)
Bas Eickhout
Tineke Strik
Kim van Sparrentak

On the Christian Union–Reformed Political Party list:
Peter van Dalen (CU, EPP Group)
Bert-Jan Ruissen (SGP, ECR)

On the Democrats 66 list: (Renew)
Sophie in 't Veld
Samira Rafaela

On the Party for the Animals list: (GUE–NGL)
Anja Hazekamp

On the 50Plus list: (EPP Group)
Toine Manders (joined the CDA on 2 June 2020)

On the Party for Freedom list: (ID) (member joined Forum for Democracy afterwards)
Marcel de Graaff – since 1 February 2020

Poland 

On the Law and Justice list: (ECR)
Adam Bielan
Joachim Brudziński
Richard Czarnecki
Anna Fotyga
Patryk Jaki (United Poland)
Krzysztof Jurgiel
Karol Karski
Beata Kempa
Izabela Kloc
Joanna Kopcińska
Zdzisław Krasnodębski (independent)
Elżbieta Kruk
Zbigniew Kuźmiuk
Ryszard Legutko
Beata Mazurek
Andżelika Możdżanowska
Tomasz Poręba
Elżbieta Rafalska
Bogdan Rzońca
Jacek Saryusz-Wolski
Beata Szydło
Grzegorz Tobiszowski
Witold Waszczykowski
Jadwiga Wiśniewska
Anna Zalewska
Kosma Złotowski
Dominik Tarczyński – since 1 February 2020

On the Spring list: (S&D)
Robert Biedroń
Łukasz Kohut
Sylwia Spurek (independent, since 30 September 2020 Greens–EFA)

On the European Coalition list:

Civic Platform (EPP Group)
Magdalena Adamowicz (independent)
Bartosz Arłukowicz
Jerzy Buzek
Jarosław Duda
Tomasz Frankowski
Andrzej Halicki
Danuta Hübner
Ewa Kopacz
Janusz Lewandowski
Elżbieta Łukacijewska
Janina Ochojska (independent)
Jan Olbrycht
Radosław Sikorski
Róża von Thun und Hohenstein (since 10 November 2021 Poland 2050 and Renew Europe)

Democratic Left Alliance (S&D)
Marek Balt
Marek Belka
Włodzimierz Cimoszewicz
Bogusław Liberadzki
Leszek Miller

Polish People's Party (EPP Group)
Krzysztof Hetman
Adam Jarubas
Jarosław Kalinowski

Portugal 

On the Socialist Party list: (S&D)
Pedro Marques
Maria Manuel Leitão Marques
Pedro Silva Pereira
Margarida Marques
André Bradford – until 18 July 2019Isabel Estrada Carvalhais – from 3 September 2019
Sara Cerdas
Carlos Zorrinho
Isabel Santos
Manuel Pizarro – until 10 September 2022 João Albuquerque – from 13 September 2022

On the Social Democratic Party list: (EPP Group)
Paulo Rangel
Lídia Pereira
José Manuel Fernandes
Maria da Graça Carvalho
Álvaro Amaro
Cláudia Aguiar

On the Left Bloc list: (GUE–NGL)
Marisa Matias
José Gusmão

On the Democratic Unitarian Coalition list: (GUE–NGL)
João Ferreira – until 5 July 2021João Pimenta Lopes – since 6 July 2021
Sandra Pereira

On the CDS – People's Party list: (EPP Group)
Nuno Melo

On the People–Animals–Nature list: (Greens-EFA)
Francisco Guerreiro (left the party on 17 June 2020)

 Romania 

On the National Liberal Party list: (EPP Group)
Rareș Bogdan
Mircea Hava
Siegfried Mureșan
Vasile BlagaAdina Vălean – until 30 November 2019Vlad Nistor – since 2 December 2019
Daniel Buda
Dan Motreanu
Gheorghe Falcă
Cristian Bușoi
Marian-Jean Marinescu

On the Social Democratic Party list: (S&D)
Rovana Plumb
Carmen Avram
Claudiu Manda
Cristian Terheș (since 12 May 2020 PNȚ-CD and ECR)
Dan Nica
Maria Grapini (since 18 May 2020 PUSL)
Tudor Ciuhodaru
Dragoș Benea
Victor Negrescu – since 1 February 2020

On the Freedom, Unity and Solidarity Party+Save Romania Union list: (Renew)
Dacian Cioloș (PLUS)Cristian Ghinea (USR) – until 22 December 2020Alin Mituța (PLUS) – since 28 December 2020
Dragoș Pîslaru (PLUS)Clotilde Armand (USR) – until 3 November 2020Vlad Gheorghe (USR) – since 10 November 2020
Dragoș Tudorache (PLUS)
Nicolae Ștefănuță (USR)
Vlad Botoș (USR)
Ramona Strugariu (PLUS)

On the PRO Romania list: (S&D)
Corina Crețu
Mihai Tudose (Since January 2020 PSD)

On the Democratic Union of Hungarians in Romania list: (EPP Group)
Iuliu Winkler
Lóránt Vincze

On the People's Movement Party list: (EPP Group)
Traian Băsescu
Eugen Tomac

 Slovakia 

On the Progressive Slovakia–Together list: (Renew)–(EPP Group)
Michal Šimečka (PS)
Vladimír Bilčík (SPOLU)
Michal Wiezik (SPOLU, since 3 December 2021 PS and Renew)
Martin Hojsík (PS)

On the Direction – Slovak Social Democracy list: (S&D)
Monika Beňová
Miroslav Čiž
Róbert Hajšel

On the Kotleba – People's Party Our Slovakia list: (Non-Inscrits)
Milan Uhrík (since 9 March 2021 REPUBLIC)
Miroslav Radačovský (since 10 February 2021 Patriot Party)

On the Freedom and Solidarity list: (ECR)
Lucia Ďuriš Nicholsonová (left the party on 14 February 2021, since 20 May 2021 Renew)
Eugen Jurzyca

On the Christian Democratic Movement list: (EPP Group)
Ivan Štefanec
Miriam Lexmann – since 1 February 2020

On the Ordinary People and Independent Personalities list: (EPP Group)
Peter Pollák

 Slovenia 

On the Slovenian Democratic Party-Slovenian People's Party list: (EPP Group)
Milan Zver
Romana Tomc
Franc Bogovič

On the Social Democrats list: (S&D)Tanja Fajon – until 13 May 2022Matjaž Nemec – since 18 May 2022
Milan Brglez

On the List of Marjan Šarec list: (Renew)
Irena Joveva
Klemen Grošelj

On the New Slovenia list: (EPP Group)
Ljudmila Novak

 Spain 

On the Spanish Socialist Workers' Party list: (S&D)
Iratxe García
Lina Gálvez
Javi López Fernández (PSC-PSOE)
Inmaculada Rodríguez-Piñero
Iban García del Blanco
Eider Gardiazabal
Nicolás González Casares
Cristina Maestre
César Luena
Clara Aguilera García
Ignacio Sánchez Amor
Mónica Silvana González
Juan Fernando López Aguilar
Adriana Maldonado López
Jonás Fernández
Alicia Homs Ginel
Javier Moreno Sánchez
Isabel García Muñoz
Domènec Ruiz Devesa
Estrella Durá Ferrandis
Marcos Ros Sempere – since 1 February 2020

On the People's Party list: (EPP Group)
Dolors Montserrat
Esteban González Pons
Antonio López-Istúriz White
Juan Ignacio Zoido
Pilar del Castillo
Javier Zarzalejos
José Manuel García-Margallo
Francisco José Millán Mon
Rosa Estaràs
Isabel Benjumea
Pablo Arias Echeverría
Leopoldo López Gil
Gabriel Mato Adrover – since 1 February 2020

On the Citizens – Party of the Citizenry list: (Renew) Luis Garicano – until 1 September 2022Eva-Maria Poptcheva – since 15 September 2022
Maite Pagazaurtundúa (UPyD)
Soraya Rodríguez
Javier Nart (left the party on 12 September 2019)
José Ramón Bauzà
Jordi Cañas Pérez
Susana Solís Pérez
Adrián Vázquez Lázara – since 1 February 2020

On the Unidas Podemos list:  (GUE–NGL)
María Eugenia Rodríguez Palop
Sira Rego (IU)
Ernest Urtasun (CatComú; in the Greens-EFA)
Idoia Villanueva
Miguel Urbán
Manu Pineda (IU)

On the Vox list: (ECR)
Jorge Buxadé
Mazaly Aguilar
Hermann Tertsch
Margarita de la Pisa Carrión – since 1 February 2020

On the Ahora Repúblicas list: (Greens-EFA)
Jordi Solé – since 23 July 2020 (ERC)Oriol Junqueras who was originally elected was not seated.Pernando Barrena (EH Bildu; in the GUE–NGL) – until 2 September 2022Ana Miranda Paz – since 5 September 2022 (BNG, Greens-EFA)
Diana Riba (ERC)

On Together for Europe list: (Non-Inscrits)
Carles Puigdemont
Antoni Comín
Clara Ponsatí – since 1 February 2020

On the Coalition for a Solidary Europe list: (Renew)
Izaskun Bilbao Barandica (EAJ/PNV)

 Sweden 

On the Social Democratic list: (S&D)
Heléne FritzonJohan Danielsson – until 29 November 2021Ilan de Basso – since 13 December 2021Jytte Guteland – until 25 September 2022Carina Ohlsson – since 26 September 2022
Erik Bergkvist
Evin Incir

On the Moderate Party list: (EPP Group)
Tomas Tobé
Jessica Polfjärd
Jörgen Warborn
Arba Kokalari

On the Sweden Democrats list: (ECR)
Peter LundgrenJessica Stegrud – until 25 September 2022Johan Nissinen – since 26 September 2022
Charlie Weimers

On the Green Party list: (Greens-EFA)
Alice Bah Kuhnke
Pär Holmgren
Jakop Dalunde – since 1 February 2020

On the Centre Party list: (Renew)Fredrick Federley – until 12 December 2020Emma Wiesner – since 4 February 2021
Abir Al-Sahlani

On the Christian Democrats list: (EPP Group)
Sara Skyttedal
David Lega

On the Left Party list: (GUE–NGL)
Malin Björk

On the Liberals list: (Renew)
Karin Karlsbro

 Former MEPs of the United Kingdom 

The term of all British MEPs ended with Brexit on 31 January 2020.

As candidates of The Brexit Party: (Non-Inscrits)
David Bull
Jonathan Bullock
Belinda De Camborne Lucy
Martin Daubney
Andrew England Kerr (after 1 October 2019 independent)
Nigel Farage
Lance Forman (after 15 January 2020 Conservatives and ECR)
Claire Fox
Nathan Gill
James Glancy
Benyamin Habib
Lucy Harris (after 10 January 2020 Conservatives and ECR)
Michael Heaver
Christina Jordan
John Longworth (after 10 January 2020 Conservatives and ECR)
Rupert Lowe
Brian Monteith
June Mummery
Henrik Overgaard Nielsen
Matthew Patten
Alexandra Phillips
Jake Pugh
Annunziata Rees-Mogg (after 10 January 2020 Conservative Party and ECR)
Robert Rowland
Louis Stedman-Bryce (after 20 November 2019 independent)
John Tennant
Richard Tice
James Wells
Ann Widdecombe

As candidates of the Liberal Democrats: (Renew)
Catherine Bearder
Phil Bennion
Jane Brophy
Judith Bunting
Chris Davies
Dinesh Dhamija
Barbara Gibson
Antony Hook
Martin Horwood
Shaffaq Mohammed
Bill Newton Dunn
Lucy Nethsingha
Luisa Porritt
Sheila Ritchie
Caroline Voaden
Irina von Wiese

As candidates of the Labour Party: (S&D)
Richard Corbett
Seb Dance
Neena Gill
Theresa Griffin
John Howarth
Jackie Jones
Jude Kirton-Darling
Claude Moraes
Rory Palmer
Julie Ward

As candidates of the Green Party of England and Wales: (Greens-EFA)
Scott Ainslie
Ellie Chowns
Gina Dowding
Magid Magid
Alex Phillips
Catherine Rowett
Molly Scott Cato

As candidates of the Conservative Party: (ECR)
Daniel Hannan
Anthea McIntyre
Nosheena Mobarik
Geoffrey Van Orden

As candidates of the Scottish National Party: (Greens-EFA)
Christian Allard
Aileen McLeodAlyn Smith – until 12 December 2019''Heather Anderson – after 27 January 2020

As a candidate of Plaid Cymru: (Greens-EFA)
Jill Evans

Northern Ireland

As a candidate of Sinn Féin: (GUE–NGL)
Martina Anderson

As a candidate of the Democratic Unionist Party: (Non-Inscrits)
Diane Dodds

As a candidate of the Alliance Party (Renew)
Naomi Long

Replacement members 
The following MEPs joined the European Parliament mid-term. On 21 January 2020, 27 seats from the British delegation were distributed to other countries as a result of Brexit.

See also
 2019 European Parliament election
 List of members of the European Parliament (2014–2019)

References

Sources 

Full list of MEPs, europarl.europa.eu
List of EPP MEPs, eppgroup.eu
List of S&D MEPs, socialistsanddemocrats.eu
List of Greens–EFA MEPs, greens-efa.eu
Leadership and MEPs of the ECR Group, ecrgroup.eu
List of GUE–NGL MEPs, guengl.eu

Current